Sterilization may refer to:

 Sterilization (microbiology), killing or inactivation of micro-organisms
 Soil steam sterilization, a farming technique that sterilizes soil with steam in open fields or greenhouses
 Sterilization (medicine) renders a human unable to reproduce
 Neutering is the surgical sterilization of animals
 Irradiation induced sterility is used in the sterile insect technique
 A chemosterilant is a chemical compound that causes sterility
 Sterilization (economics), central bank operations aimed at neutralizing foreign exchange operations' impact on domestic money supply, or offset adverse consequences of large capital flows

See also
 Sterility